MotoGP 15 is a video game developed by Milestone srl. The game was released for Microsoft Windows, PlayStation 3, PlayStation 4, Xbox 360 and Xbox One on 24 June 2015. It is the first to be released on Xbox One and final installment for PlayStation 3 and Xbox 360.

Features

MotoGP 15 features 18 tracks, and the official riders from the 2014 and 2015 seasons of Moto3, Moto2 and MotoGP, and will also feature customizable bikes. The season starts with the night race in Losail, and also includes Jerez, Assen and Sepang, with a wind and wet weather system. Other features include tire wear, damage and mechanical failures.

Per official entries, Paul Bird Motorsport retired from the championship, but Suzuki and Aprilia made an official return. One new feature is the ability for the player to create their own racing team, with choice of logo and livery. Starting off with a Mahindra MGP3O bike, the player must advance through the classes, and recruit sponsors. The game also has a mode which focuses on recreating events from the 2014 season, and in particular the rivalry between Jorge Lorenzo, Valentino Rossi and Marc Márquez, and the comebacks from riders such as Andrea Iannone. The PlayStation 4 version features an online league mode, where players battle for the best lap times.

The game includes a total of over 100 riders, each in their respective teams, making up the three current classes (e.g. the Ducati Desmosedici and Honda NSF250R), and one historic class (covering 1992-2001, e.g. the Cagiva GP500), with a total of around 25 bikes. Some riders need to be unlocked via the game's experience/level system. A further historic class is available to download (covering 2004-2006, e.g. the Kawasaki ZX-RR). After Releasing of DLC 4-Stroke Champions It is the first game under Milestone srl to feature the main 
Kawasaki ZX-RR Motorcycle.

Pre-race introduction voice-overs are provided by Gavin Emmett.

Downloadable content
In June 2015, 20 riders from the 2004 season were made available. In September 2015, 24 riders from the 2015 Red Bull MotoGP Rookies Cup season were made available. In December 2015, the Autódromo do Estoril (last used in 2012) was released, and can be used in single and multi-player modes.

Reception

The game had mixed reviews. The developer issued a warning that the Xbox One version contained a number of bugs. On the PlayStation 4, the consensus was that it looked ok, but did not improve significantly on the previous game. The Official PlayStation Magazine praised the bike handling, adding that "AI riders put up a great fight, outbraking you into hairpins and slipstreaming past you down the straights. ... overall, the racing is solid and challenging, and securing a podium finish without resorting to the rewind function is a significant achievement."  Analog Addiction praised the customisable race options and the stable and enjoyable multiplayer component.

MotoGP 15 reached number 11 in the UK PS3 sales charts, as of April 19, 2016 still not available in North America and number 16 in the PS4 charts.

References

2015 video games
Video games developed in Italy
Grand Prix motorcycle racing video games
Racing video games
Grand Prix motorcycle racing
PlayStation 3 games
PlayStation 4 games
Windows games
Xbox 360 games
Xbox One games
Multiplayer and single-player video games
Split-screen multiplayer games
Multiplayer online games
Video games set in Argentina
Video games set in Australia
Video games set in the Czech Republic
Video games set in England
Video games set in France
Video games set in Germany
Video games set in Indianapolis
Video games set in Italy
Video games set in Japan
Video games set in Malaysia
Video games set in the Netherlands
Video games set in Qatar
Video games set in Spain
Video games set in Texas
Video games with downloadable content
Milestone srl games